Brian Croucher (born 23 January 1942) is an English actor and director best known for his role as Ted Hills, which he played from 1995 to 1997, in the soap opera EastEnders. Croucher also had a regular role in the science fiction series Blake's 7.

Biography
Croucher has appeared in a number of science fiction programmes, including being the second actor to portray Travis in Blake's 7. He played Borg in the Doctor Who story The Robots of Death. He also appeared in the Doctor Who spin-off Shakedown: Return of the Sontarans. Earlier, in 1973, he played a key protagonist in the children's adventure series The Jensen Code.

In 1978, Croucher played a major role opposite Tom Bell in the Thames Television/Euston Films thriller series Out. He also played the role of Rooky in the Southern Television series The Famous Five, in the double episode "Five Get into Trouble".

One of Croucher's earliest film roles was in the Carol Reed film musical of Lionel Bart's Oliver!; he played one of the London Bridge bargemen—a small uncredited speaking part. His other film roles include Burke & Hare (1972), Made (1972), A Nightingale Sang in Berkeley Square (1979), Scrubbers (1983), and Underworld (1985).

Apart from acting, Croucher has directed two short films, Rank (2009, co-written with Nick Wilkinson) and Vodka & Coke (2013), also written and produced by Wilkinson.

Selected filmography

Film

Television

References

External links
 

Male actors from Surrey
English male soap opera actors
1942 births
Living people